ATP synthase subunit s, mitochondrial is an enzyme that in humans is encoded by the ATP5S gene.

This gene encodes a subunit of mitochondrial ATP synthase. Mitochondrial ATP synthase catalyzes ATP synthesis, utilizing an electrochemical gradient of protons across the inner membrane during oxidative phosphorylation. ATP synthase is composed of two linked multi-subunit complexes: the soluble catalytic core, F1, and the membrane-spanning component, Fo, comprising the proton channel. This gene encodes the subunit s, also known as factor B, of the proton channel. This subunit is necessary for the energy transduction activity of the ATP synthase complexes. Alternatively spliced transcript variants encoding different isoforms have been identified.

References

External links
 
 ATP5S: ATP synthase, H+ transporting, mitochondrial Fo complex subunit s (factor B)

Further reading